Salvia atropurpurea is a perennial plant that is native to Yunnan province in China, growing on grassy slopes at  elevation.

Notes

atropurpurea
Flora of China